The Four Journeys is a collection of four shenmo novels that were published during the Ming dynasty Wanli era, and they consist of Journey to the North, Journey to the South, Journey to the East, and Journey to the West.

Journey to the North was composed by Yu Xiangdou (余象斗).
Journey to the South was composed by Yu Xiangdou (余象斗).
Journey to the East was composed by Wu Yuan-tai (吳元泰,  1522-1526).
Journey to the West is composed by Yang Zhihe (楊致和).

Bibliography
Gary Seaman (tr.): Journey to the North. University of California Press, 1987.
List of personages in the Journey to the North
"Divine Authorship of the Journey to the North".

References

Chinese classic novels
Shenmo novels
Ming dynasty novels